Heat Treatment is the second album by English singer-songwriter Graham Parker and his band The Rumour, released in 1976. A close follow-up to Parker's debut album Howlin' Wind, Heat Treatment was well received by critics and contains signature Parker songs like the rollicking title track, "Pourin' It All Out", and "Fool's Gold". "That's What They All Say" is a Dylan-esque putdown from a realist perspective, while "Turned Up Too Late" was perhaps Parker's most emotionally mature composition to date. "Black Honey" is a dark, downcast sequel to the debut's upbeat first track "White Honey". "Hotel Chambermaid" was covered many years later by Rod Stewart. The Rumour was credited on the back cover and the label, but not on the album's front cover.

In 2001, Vertigo/Mercury issued a remastered and expanded CD, including two tracks from The Pink Parker EP.

Critical reception

Rolling Stones Simon Frith wrote that Heat Treatment "confirms the promise" of Howlin' Wind and showcases Parker and his band performing with a "sheer attack" that makes Howlin' Wind "sound suddenly subdued". Heat Treatment finished second in The Village Voices 1976 Pazz & Jop critics' poll of the year's best albums, with Howlin' Wind placing fourth.

In recent years, Parker on his website has singled out the album as one of his least favorite of his own works, citing his inexperienced vocal technique, his rushed songwriting, and the stiff production by Robert John "Mutt" Lange.

Track listing
All songs written by Graham Parker except as indicated.
 "Heat Treatment" – 3:07
 "That's What They All Say" – 3:46
 "Turned Up Too Late" – 3:38
 "Black Honey" – 3:57
 "Hotel Chambermaid" – 2:55
 "Pourin' It All Out" – 3:15
 "Back Door Love" – 3:01
 "Something You're Going Through" – 4:10
 "Help Me Shake It" – 3:37
 "Fools' Gold" – 4:15

2001 Bonus Tracks (from Pink Parker EP)
 "Hold Back the Night" (Dennis Harris, Allan Felder, Ronald Baker, Earl Young) – 3:01
 "(Let Me Get) Sweet on You" – 2:44

Personnel
Graham Parker – vocals, acoustic guitar, electric guitar
Bob Andrews – keyboards, backing vocals
Brinsley Schwarz – guitar, backing vocals
Steve Goulding – drums, backing vocals
Andrew Bodnar – Fender bass
Martin Belmont – guitar, backing vocals

Additional personnel
John "Viscount" Earle – saxophones
Danny Ellis – trombone
Albie Donnelly – saxophones
Dick Hanson – trumpet

Charts

Album

Single

References

Graham Parker albums
1976 albums
Albums produced by Robert John "Mutt" Lange
Mercury Records albums
Vertigo Records albums
Albums recorded at Rockfield Studios